Speranza is an annual youth festival held by the Indian Institute of Technology Delhi during the spring semester. The brainchild of Board of Student Welfare takes its name from the Italian word for hope. The event was introduced to commemorate IIT Delhi's 50th anniversary.  The festival is primarily aimed at youth and student development, promoting positive lifestyles and aims at motivating students to engage in productive activities. Events at the festival include a meeting with alumni and startup corporates, where students are given a chance to talk with prestigious alumni and successful entrepreneurs to learn from their experiences, talk shows, where students can interact with eminent personalities in popular media, a bonfire accompanied by music and dancing, technical seminars and training classrooms that impart the basic skills of web and software designing to students, sex education discussions including quizzes and debates, fire drills that are designed to train students to act intelligently in event of a fire, an education orientation that provides students the opportunity to prepare for higher education in a variety of fields, and a book fair.

“We must accept finite disappointment but never lose infinite hope.” by Martin Luther King

Speranza was launched as a pedestal to create a generation of strong willed, self-reliant and aware youth, capable of discovering new paths and leaving behind their own trail, a trail leading to newer, brighter horizons. There exists a burning flame in each individual to something worthwhile, which can affect their own life and society. This flame is fuelled by hope and faith, and providing this requisite fuel is what Speranza is about.

Speranza, in the course of a three-day period, achieves its mission of holistic development of individuals through various workshops, talkshows, interactive sessions, a mélange of cultural activities. There is always more than one facet of a diamond, and as individuals we all have a distribution of characteristics. Overall development implies working on each facet of our being and personality, polishing of each facet can only ensure a flawless diamond.

Speranza, in its 5th year, envisages to acknowledge the proliferating passion in the youth about social welfare. This year, we are returning with a strong motive and even higher targets. Speranza 2018 has come up with a motto "Rule The Roulette". Speranza 2018 will be a unique opportunity to let everyone explore their inner self; discover their passion and return to life with greater zeal.

References

External links 
 Speranza 2013 home page
 Board of Student Welfare home page

Indian Institutes of Technology festivals